The São Miguel do Araguaia Microregion is a geographical region in northwest Goiás state, Brazil.  The total population is 77,067 inhabitants (2012) in an area of 24,471.80 km2.

Municipalities 
The microregion consists of the following municipalities:
São Miguel do Araguaia
Crixás
Mozarlândia 
Mundo Novo
Nova Crixás
Novo Planalto
Uirapuru

See also
List of municipalities in Goiás
Microregions of Goiás

References

Microregions of Goiás